"Mrs. International" is a song by American hip hop duo Method Man & Redman, released on May 5, 2009, as the third single from their third studio album, Blackout! 2 (2009). The song was produced by Buckwild. The song is also noted for its reference and sample use of Tweet's single, "Call Me".

Music video
The music video, directed by Dale Restighini (a.k.a. RAGE) and Kevin James Custer, was released on June 25, 2009.  The video appeared as the "New Joint of the Day" on BET's 106 & Park on July 6, 2009. Cameo appearances are made by "Rabbit" from Real Chance of Love and "Myamee" from Flavor of Love 3.

References

External links

2009 singles
Method Man songs
Redman (rapper) songs
Def Jam Recordings singles
Songs written by Method Man
Songs written by Buckwild (music producer)
Songs written by Redman (rapper)
2009 songs
Song recordings produced by Buckwild (music producer)